This article is a list of national anthem performers at the Super Bowl. The U.S. national anthem ("The Star-Spangled Banner") has been performed at all but one Super Bowl since its first year in 1967; Vikki Carr sang "America the Beautiful" in place of the anthem at Super Bowl XI in 1977. Since Super Bowl XVI in 1982, famous singers or music groups have performed the anthem at the vast majority of Super Bowl games. Since Super Bowl XXVI in 1992, an American Sign Language (ASL) performer has sung the national anthem in ASL. 

Beginning with Super Bowl XLIII in 2009, "America the Beautiful" is sung before the national anthem every year and is followed by the presentation of the colors and a military flyover preceded the anthem. Beginning in 2021, "Lift Every Voice And Sing" was sung prior to "America the Beautiful" and the national anthem in honor of Black History Month. Some early Super Bowls featured marching bands performing the anthem and the recitation of the Pledge of Allegiance.

Performances

Multiple and hometown performances
Acts that have performed three times:
Marlee Matlin (ASL), (XXVII, XLI, and 50)

Acts that have performed two times:
GSU Tiger Marching Band (II and IX)
Billy Joel (XXIII and XLI)
Aaron Neville (XXIV and XL)
U.S. Air Force Academy Chorale (VI and XXXIX)

Singers that performed in or near their hometown metropolitan area:
Beyoncé (XXXVIII, Houston)
Aretha Franklin (XL, Detroit)
Al Hirt (IV, New Orleans)
Aaron Neville (XXIV & XL, New Orleans)
Diana Ross (XVI, Detroit)
Jordin Sparks (XLII, Phoenix)
Gladys Knight (LIII, Atlanta)

Notable performances

The performance by Whitney Houston at Super Bowl XXV in 1991, during the Gulf War, has been for many years regarded as one of the best renditions ever. It was released as a single a few weeks later, appeared on the album Whitney: The Greatest Hits, and was re-released as a single in 2001 shortly after the September 11 attacks.

The 1992 performance marked the first time American Sign Language was used alongside the lead singer.

Faith Hill performed the anthem at Super Bowl XXXIV in 2000. It became popular in country radio. Following the September 11 attacks, her version entered the country singles chart at number 35, despite not being released as an official single, and reentered the same chart at number 49 in July 2002.

At Super Bowl XLVIII in 2014, in an emotional and groundbreaking performance, soprano Renée Fleming became the first opera singer to perform the national anthem, and helping the Fox network achieve its highest ratings in its history, and remains so today.

Controversies
Since 1993, the NFL has required performers to supply a backup track. This came after Garth Brooks walked out of the stadium prior to his XXVII performance. Only 45 minutes before kickoff, he refused to take the stage, due to a dispute with NBC. Brooks requested that the network premiere the music video for his new single "We Shall Be Free" during the pregame. The network chose not to air the video, due to content some felt was disturbing imagery. Brooks had also refused to pre-record the anthem, which meant the league had nothing to play if he left. Television producers spotted Jon Bon Jovi in the grandstands, and were prepared to use him as a replacement. After last-minute negotiations, NBC agreed to air a clip of the video during the broadcast of the game, and Brooks was coaxed back into the stadium and sang.

Following the "wardrobe malfunction" controversy during Super Bowl XXXVIII in 2004, all scheduled performers for Super Bowl XXXIX were chosen under heavy scrutiny. Game organizers decided not to use a popular music vocalist. The combined choirs of the U.S. Military Academy, the Naval Academy, Air Force Academy, Coast Guard Academy, and the U.S. Army Herald Trumpets were invited to perform. This was the first time since the second inauguration of President Richard Nixon in 1973 that all four service academies sang together.

Two days after Super Bowl XLIII, it was revealed that Jennifer Hudson also had lip synced.

At the beginning of Super Bowl XLV, Christina Aguilera sang the lyrics incorrectly. Instead of singing "O'er the ramparts we watched, were so gallantly streaming", the pop star sang "What so proudly we watched at the twilight's last gleaming". According to the New York Times, she also changed "gleaming" to "reaming".

Other patriotic performances

The following Super Bowls featured other patriotic performances besides the national anthem. Since 2009, "America the Beautiful" is sung before the national anthem.

Pledge of Allegiance
1969: Apollo 8 crew
1970: Apollo astronauts
1973: Apollo 17 crew

"America the Beautiful"
1974: Charley Pride
1977: Vikki Carr (in place of the national anthem)
2001: Ray Charles
2002: Mary J. Blige, Marc Anthony and the Boston Pops Orchestra
2005: Alicia Keys and a tribute video to the recently deceased Ray Charles
2009: Faith Hill
2010: Queen Latifah
2011: Lea Michele
2012: Blake Shelton and Miranda Lambert
2013: Jennifer Hudson with the Sandy Hook Elementary School Chorus
2014: Queen Latifah with the New Jersey Youth Chorus
2015: John Legend
2016: U.S. Armed Forces Chorus
2017: Phillipa Soo, Renée Elise Goldsberry and Jasmine Cephas Jones.
2018: Leslie Odom Jr.
2019: Chloe x Halle
2020: Yolanda Adams
2021: H.E.R.
2022: Jhené Aiko
2023: Babyface

"God Bless America"
2003: Céline Dion

"Lift Every Voice and Sing'"
2021: Alicia Keys
2022: Mary Mary
2023: Sheryl Lee Ralph

See also
 Super Bowl
 List of Super Bowl halftime shows

References

National anthem performers at the Super Bowl
Super Bowl
National anthem performers
The Star-Spangled Banner